The Union of Poles in Belarus (Sajuz paliakaŭ Bielarusi) is an organisation located in Belarus. The group, which has a membership of 20,000 people, represents the Polish minority in Belarus, numbering about 300,000 it forms the second largest ethnic minority in the country after the Russians, at 3.1% of the total population. An estimated 180,905 Belarusian Poles live in large agglomerations and 113,644 in smaller settlements, with the number of women exceeding the number of men by about 33,000., as per official data (and much higher according to unofficial estimates).

Lately, the group has received international attention due to the Belarusian Government cracking down on the group and their activities. The leader of Belarus, Alexander Lukashenko, has accused Poland and the European Union of trying to use the group to create an uprising similar to what took place in Ukraine, Georgia and Kyrgyzstan.

Since 2005, there are two groups using the above name. The first, is that led by Andżelika Borys  which is prohibited by Belarusian government. The second, has the support of the Belarusian government, and is led by Stanisław Siemaszko.

References

External links 

 Bordering on madness:Belarus mistreats its Polish minority, The Economist, Jun 16th 2005
  Polish-Belarusian relations STATEMENT OF THE POLISH MINISTRY OF FOREIGN AFFAIRS, July 28th, 2005
 Embassy of Belarus in the USA - On State Policy of the Republic of Belarus in the Sphere of Interethnic Relations - Specifics of the Developments Around the «Union of Poles in Belarus»
 The Union Of Poles Mistreated In Belarus

 
Belarus–Poland relations
Polish culture
Polish diaspora organizations
Year of establishment missing